Anthony Ike Ugoh, Jr. (born November 17, 1983) is a former American football offensive tackle, who played for five seasons in the National Football League (NFL). After playing college football for Arkansas, he was drafted by the Indianapolis Colts in the second round of the 2007 NFL Draft. He played for the Colts from 2007 to 2009, the Detroit Lions in 2010, and the New York Giants in 2011.

Early years
Ugoh's parents are originally from Nigeria. He played football at Wells Middle School and at Westfield High School, both in Houston, Texas.

College career
Ugoh played college football at the University of Arkansas. During his career he started 35 of 43 games and was chosen as a third-team All-America by the Associated Press and first-team All-Southeastern Conference as a senior. He also competed in discus and weight throw for the Razorback track team.

Professional career

Indianapolis Colts
Ugoh was drafted by the Indianapolis Colts in the second round of the 2007 NFL Draft, after the Colts gave up a first-round pick in 2008 for the chance to move up in the 2007 draft and select him.  He took over as the starting left tackle after Tarik Glenn retired during the offseason. The Colts waived Ugoh on September 8, 2010.

Detroit Lions
On December 10, 2010, the Lions worked Ugoh out and then signed him the next day to take the roster spot of linebacker Isaiah Ekejiuba, who was placed on injured reserve due to a knee injury. Ugoh's signing was seen as insurance if starting right tackle Gosder Cherilus was unable to play in the Lions' week 14 game against the Green Bay Packers due to a knee injury. He was released on August 14, 2011.

New York Giants
On December 7, 2011, the New York Giants signed Ugoh as a free agent, after placing Stacy Andrews on injured reserve. He became a free agent after the season.

Kansas City Chiefs
The Kansas City Chiefs signed Ugoh on July 26, 2012. He retired four days later.

References

External links
Kansas City Chiefs bio
Arkansas Razorbacks bio

1983 births
Living people
American sportspeople of Nigerian descent
Players of American football from Houston
Nigerian players of American football
American football offensive tackles
Arkansas Razorbacks men's track and field athletes
Arkansas Razorbacks football players
Indianapolis Colts players
Detroit Lions players
New York Giants players
Kansas City Chiefs players